The first alpine club, the Alpine Club, based in the United Kingdom, was founded in London in 1857 as a gentlemen's club. It was once described as:
"a club of English gentlemen devoted to mountaineering, first of all in the Alps, members of which have successfully addressed themselves to attempts of the kind on loftier mountains" (Nuttall Encyclopaedia, 1907).

Alpine clubs are typically large social clubs that revolve around climbing, hiking, and other outdoor activities. Many alpine clubs also take on aspects typically reserved for local sport associations, providing education and training courses, services for outdoorsmen, and de facto regulation of local mountaineering resources and behavior of mountaineers. Most clubs organize social events, schedule outings, stage climbing competitions, operate alpine huts and paths, and are active in protecting the alpine environment.

With around 1,000,000 members the German Alpine Club is usually reckoned as the largest alpine club in the world.

List of Alpine clubs

References

External links
 Article for Men's Vogue

Climbing organizations
Alpine clubs
Alpine